Charles Wallace Smith (April 22, 1864August 11, 1939) was the Speaker of the Michigan House of Representatives from 1915 to 1916.

Early life 
Smith was born on April 22, 1864 in Oregon Township, Michigan to parents Hiram and Ann Smith.

Career 
Before being elected to the legislature, Smith worked as treasurer-secretary for the Lapeer Gas-Electric Company. In the state legislature, Smith represented Lapeer County from 1911 to 1916. From 1915 to 1916, he also served as Speaker of the Michigan House of Representatives. Smith was the alternate delegate to the Republican National Convention from Michigan in 1912 and 1920. Smith was an unsuccessful candidate in the 1924 primary for the Michigan Senate from the 24th District.

Personal life 
Smith married Betty Snyder in 1890.

Death 
Smith died at his home in Lapeer on August 11, 1939.

References 

1864 births
1939 deaths
Speakers of the Michigan House of Representatives
Republican Party members of the Michigan House of Representatives
Burials in Michigan
20th-century American politicians